USS Mount Hood (AE-29) was a Kilauea-class ammunition ship in the United States Navy. She was the second Navy munitions ship to be named after Mount Hood, a volcano in the Cascade Range in Oregon.

Mount Hood was laid down 8 May 1967 by Bethlehem Steel Corporation, Sparrows Point, Maryland; launched 17 July 1968; sponsored by Mrs. Robert A. Frosch, wife of the Assistant Secretary of the Navy for Research and Development; and commissioned on 1 May 1971. She was homeported in Concord, California.

Unlike her seven sister ships of the Kilauea class, she was never transferred to the Military Sealift Command. She was decommissioned in August 1999 and held in reserve at Bremerton, Washington, before being moved in October 1999 to Suisun Bay, California.

She was sold for scrapping on 21 August 2013 and placed under tow 5 September 2013 to Brownsville, Texas, to be dismantled.

References

External links 
Mount Hood at Navsource
USS Mount Hood
 

Kilauea-class ammunition ships
Ships built in Sparrows Point, Maryland
1968 ships